Farsian (also Romanized as Fārsīān, Fārseyān, and Fārsīyān; also known as Fārsīān-e Farang, Farsian Faraug, Pārsiān, and Qal‘eh-i-Fārsiān-i-Firang) is a village in Nilkuh Rural District in the Central District of Galikash County, Golestan Province, Iran. At the 2006 census, its population was 408, in 114 families.

References 

Populated places in Galikash County